Kathleen Utgoff, an American economist, was Commissioner of the Bureau of Labor Statistics from 2002–2006.

Education 
Utgoff holds a BA degree in Economics from California State University, Northridge, and a PhD in Economics from UCLA (1978).

Career 
Utgoff began her career at the Center for Naval Analyses and served as a senior economist at the Council of Economic Advisers during the Reagan administration.  President Reagan appointed her as executive director of the Pension Benefit Guarantee Corporation in 1985.

During her time as Commissioner of the Bureau of Labor Statistics, BLS increased the number of data series published and expanded internet-based data collection.  Utgoff is also credited with establishing an "unofficial motto" for BLS:  "When asked whether the glass is half full or half empty, the bureau’s response is, It’s an eight-ounce glass with four ounces of liquid."

Selected works
 Utgoff, Kathleen Classen. "Compensation levels and quit rates in the public sector." Journal of Human Resources (1983): 394-406.
 Utgoff, Kathleen P., and Zvi Bodie. "The PBGC: A costly lesson in the economics of federal insurance." In Government Risk-Bearing, pp. 145–166. Springer, Dordrecht, 1993.
 Utgoff, Kathleen P. "Pension Reform Strengthens Defined-Benefit Plans." Compensation and Benefits Management 4 (1988): 273-5.

References 

American women economists
Economists from California
20th-century American economists
21st-century American economists
Bureau of Labor Statistics
United States Department of Labor officials
George W. Bush administration personnel
American civil servants
California State University, Northridge alumni
University of California, Los Angeles alumni
Labor economists
Living people
Year of birth missing (living people)
21st-century American women